Geppetto is the creator of Pinocchio in the 1883 novel, 1940 film, and subsequent versions.

Geppetto may also refer to:

Characters
Geppetto (Fables), a fictional character in the comic Fables
Geppetto (Once Upon a Time) (also known as Marco), a fictional character in the ABC television series Once Upon a Time
 Gepetto, a playable character in Shadow Hearts: Covenant
Dr. Geppetto Bosconovich, a character in the Tekken video games

Films
Geppetto (film), a 2000 television film on The Wonderful World of Disney starring Drew Carey in the title role and Julia Louis-Dreyfus as the Blue Fairy

Songs
 "Gepetto", a song by the alternative rock band Belly from the 1993 album Star
 "Gepetto", a song by the Italian metal band Novembre from the 2006 album Materia

See also
 Jepetto, an alternative rock band from Maryland, USA
 The Jepettos, an alternative folk band from Northern Ireland

Italian masculine given names